Edward Gordon Williams (20 July 1888 – 12 August 1915) was a British rower who competed in the 1908 Summer Olympics. He was killed in action during the First World War.

Williams was born at Honiton, Devon, and educated at Eton and Trinity College, Cambridge, where he was a member of the Pitt Club. He rowed for Cambridge in the Boat Race in 1908. The Cambridge crew made up a boat in the eights which won the bronze medal for Great Britain rowing at the 1908 Summer Olympics. He rowed for Cambridge in the Boat Race in 1909 and also in 1909 partnered Banner Johnstone to win the Silver Goblets at Henley Royal Regatta against Julius Beresford and Karl Vernon. He raced in the 1910 Boat Race.

Williams was appointed as a colonial administrator in North-Western Rhodesia. He then served in the First World War as a lieutenant with the Grenadier Guards. He was killed in action aged 27 near Béthune and was buried at St. Venant Communal Cemetery nearby.

See also
 List of Olympians killed in World War I
 List of Cambridge University Boat Race crews

References

1888 births
1915 deaths
Alumni of Trinity College, Cambridge
British military personnel killed in World War I
British male rowers
Grenadier Guards officers
People educated at Eton College
Olympic bronze medallists for Great Britain
Olympic rowers of Great Britain
Rowers at the 1908 Summer Olympics
Olympic medalists in rowing
Medalists at the 1908 Summer Olympics
British Army personnel of World War I